Uromi,the real word is Urọnmhun meaning "this is my abode ",or my enclave is a city located in north-eastern Esan, a sub-ethnic group of the Benin in Edo state, Nigeria.  At various points in Uromi's history, the city and people have been an important part of the Benin Empire.

History 
Uromi, originally known as 'Uronmun', is the most populated area in Esanland, settled by two waves of people. The first wave consisted of migrants from Benin and other outlying areas between 900 and 1400 AD. These early settlers formed a loose-knit community engaged mostly around farming and hunting and did not develop any stylized form of government; associations were instead based on kinship and occupation. Many of these early Bini settlers were fugitives fleeing persecution from the harsh rule of the Ogiso of Benin, and were wary of monarchical government.

The second wave of organized mass emigration from Bini was around 1460, during the reign of Oba Ewuare the Selfish. He attempted to stop the emigration of Binis to the present-day Esanland by building a moat around the City.  Most of these immigrants during this wave were from Idumoza of Benin City.

At about the same time as this second wave of migration, Oba Ewuare sent his son to found a kingdom of his own. This son was the product of a liaison with a Portuguese woman. Although the boy was Oba Ewuare's first-born son, he was kept away from public view because he was half-caste; Ewuare could not marry the Portuguese mother and the half-caste boy could not be introduced as heir to the throne. When the boy came of age he was sent, with a retinue of attendants and an armed guard, to found a kingdom of his own. Upon reaching the settlement of Uronmun he was welcomed as a god-sent. The people there had never seen a half-caste before and his retinue of attendants gave indication of his regal ancestry. He was accepted as the first Onojie (king) of what had now become a sizeable settlement. Attendants were sent back to Oba Ewuare to inform him that his son had founded a kingdom at Uronmun and Ewuare sent them back with the message that the new king should bear the title Ijesan (the king of Esan). The name has over time been more usually written as Ichesan.

Uromi is a conurbation of villages divided into three groups, recognized as Okhiode, Obiruan and Obiyon.

The villages of Okhiode 
Consisting of: 
 Eguare
 Egbele
 Onewa
 Utako
 Unuwazi
 Arue and Isua
 Uje Oror

The villages of Obiruan 

Consisting of: 
 Ebhoiyi
 Efadion
 Ekhue
 Ubierumun
 
 Obeidu
 Uwalor
 Idumoza
 Ivue
 Idumhengan Ebhoyi
 Eko-Ibadin
 Uwalor Okpere

The villages of Obiyon 
Consisting of:
 Ukoni
 Amedeokhian
 Awo

Eguare, the seat of the Onojie of Uromi, is made up of seven villages, namely:
 Ikekiala
 Okpujie 
 Oyomon
 Odigule
 Okhieren
 Uwalor-Okpere 
 Uwalor-Usogho
 Idejie

The seven villages have the responsibility of crowning a new king.

One of the leaders of the second wave of migration to Uronmun was "Oghu", also a son of Oba Ewuare. He and his followers settled in Ivue, where Ichesan was also residing and had built his palace. A political struggle for the throne ensued between the two brothers Oghu and Ichesan. Ichesan traveled secretly to Benin to inform his father of Oghu's recalcitrance. Oba Ewuare explained to Ichesan that, although he was the older son, by tradition he held no seniority over his junior brothers. Oba Ewuare said that he would send word to Oghu telling him that he (Ewuare) had already conferred the title of Ijesan and that Oghu must respect his father's decree, but Ewuare also asked Ijesan to respect his brother and relocate. It is also the smallest city in Nigeria.

Upon return to Uronmun, to avoid embarrassing his "older" brother, and in keeping with his father's dictate, Ichesan moved from Ivue to present day Eguare, where the royal family of Uromi reside to this day.

Ichesan was succeeded by Agba, then Ikenoa,'Ehenoa, Ikhivabhojere, Okuoye, Akhize, Ikhimigbale, Uwagbo, Ediale, Akhilomen, Okolojie, Okojie (Ogbidi), Uwagbale, Edenojie Okojie II, Omelimen Edenojie I, and Anslem Edenojie II.'''

Economy 
A large percentage of the economy of Uromi is derived from local farming and trading, with some contribution from the government's budget. Uromi's productive farm output is mainly the result of its situation in a rain forest zone, its loamy soil type and its topography.

Uromi also has a good number of markets that provide opportunities for local farmers to trade their farm products. The Uromi Main Market has good, portable lock-up stores. Although officially market day is held at four-day intervals, the Uromi Main Market operates daily from morning to late evening. Across Uromi, there may be up to three markets in each village, with some village markets functioning at four-day intervals, while others trade every day.

Apart from farming and trading, other business transactions take place on a daily basis. In Eguare, there are many business offices both in the government-owned business sector and in the privately owned business sectors. Some examples of financial businesses include the Union Bank, United Bank for Africa (UBA), First Bank of Nigeria, Unity Bank, Zenith Bank, EcoBank, Fidelity Bank, Uromi Community Bank, and other monetary firms like the Uromi Microfinance Bank, etc.

Uromi has an Institute of Construction Technology and Management located in Amedokhian and the Uromi Technical College in Onewa Village.

Religion and belief 
Uromi traditional religion has many similarities to the Bini traditional religion, even though Westernization has caused Christianity and Islamic influence. And of course, this is because originally the Esans hails from the Benin Kingdom.

Esan religion has so many deities, which among them are:

Osanobua: which actually is the main and really Edo-Esan god. This name was adopted into Christianity as God, and thus the meaning and the translation for God in Esanland is Osanobua.

Eshu: This is the Esan trickster god. This god is related with the Yoruba and Edo myth. This name "Eshu" was also adopted into the Western religion, which is translated as Satan by Christian missionaries.

Osun: This is the Esan god of medicine. This is god can also be said to be related to the Yoruba deity (known as osun). This is where the surname "Olokun" known as the "son of medicine" originated from.

Festivals 
Talking about Uromi, we must mention some of the traditional festivals with the knowledge that Uromi people value their tradition so much. Speaking on one of the festivals known as OTO-UROMI and briefly on Amukpe.

As the name implies, Oto-Uromi (Uromi land) is celebrated in the month of July or early August. This celebration is done to appease the land of Uromi in order for good harvest. The date for this festival is always a market day, fixed by the Onojie of Uromi who acts on the advice of his Chiefs. The people are given a notice of 15 days after the announcement of the date for the purpose of preparation.

It is a custom that no one goes to the farm on the day of celebration. The ceremony is performed on a chosen spot by Iwienbola people. To appease the land or the soil, these items are brought; Four sticks of chalk, four kola-nuts, cowries, ripe pumpkin and a dog. The people merry, sharing gifts among themselves, most especially, in every home, women send gift to their husbands for giving them portion of the farm for the year. After the festival, the Onojie of Uromi summons his elders and chiefs and through them appreciates the people for making the celebration a success.

Another festival celebrated in Uromi is the Amukpe festival which is celebrated yearly during the month of August. It is always a day celebration which is meant to usher in new yams.

Geography 
The city of Uromi lies in north-eastern Esan in Edo State, Nigeria, located on longitude 3° 24' E and latitude 6° 27' N. Almost the whole of the city is covered with land.

Climate 
The climate in Uromi is similar to that of the rest of southern Nigeria. There are two rainy seasons, with the heaviest rains falling from April to July and a weaker rainy season in October and November. There is a brief relatively dry spell in August and September and a longer dry season from December to March. Monthly rainfall between May and July averages over 300 mm (12 in), while in August and September it is down to 75 mm (3 inches) and in January as low as 35 mm (1.5 inches). The main dry season is accompanied by harmattan winds from the Sahara Desert, which between December and early February can be quite strong. The average temperature in January is 27 °C (79 °F) and for July it is 25 °C (77 °F). On average the hottest month is March; with a mean temperature of 29 °C (84 °F); while July is the coolest month.

Politics and government 
Uromi is not a municipality and has therefore no overall city administration or governance but instead, it is run by the Local government council headed by a Chairman.

Uromi is not a local government but is the seat of the local government council governing the Esan-North-East local government area. The administration of the government of Uromi is divided into eleven (11) wards. Each ward delegates a Councillor who represents it at its local council election who is normally tenured for four years.

Notable people
 Chief Anthony Enahoro
 Chief Tony Anenih
 Anthony Cardinal Olubunmi Okogie
 Chris Aire
 Dr. Robert S. Okojie (research scientist, NASA)
Benita Okojie (Gospel singer, actress and songwriter)

Kingdom and traditional leadership 
The Uromi kingdom is a monarchical territory headed by a king (Onojie) who handles the leadership of the kingdom. The leadership in the Uromi kingdom is a hereditary monarchy system. The king is the monarch who rules with the body of chiefs who assist the king in the leadership of the kingdom.

The kingdom was installed in 1463 by the Bini Monarch Oba Ewuare conferring kingship on Ichesan (first Onojie of Uromi). Since 1463, the kingship has passed through inheritance.

List of Kings of Uromi kingdom 

 Ichesan
 Agba N’Ojie
 Ikenoa
 Ehenoa
 Ikhivabhojere
 Okuoye
 Ikhize
 Ikhimigbale
 Uwagbo
 Ediale
 Akhilomen
 Okolo N’Ojie
 Ogbidi Okojie
 Uwagbale
 Edenojie Okojie I
 Omelimen Edenojie I
 Anslem Edenojie II

The different villages of Uromi are led by the Elders of the individual villages who are responsible to the king. The council of Elders are headed by an indigenous elderly man who by birth is eldest among all the male indigenes. The council of elders have their own legislative authority and so are able to mete out punishment to offenders within their designation

Gallery

See also
 Esan-North-East
 Esan people
 Edo State

Footnotes
 History of Uromi. c/o Uromi Community Association New York

References

Populated places in Edo State
Sub-ethnic groups